"Rapunzel" ) ; is a European fairy tale most notably recorded by the Brothers Grimm and published in 1812 as part of Children's and Household Tales (KHM 12). The Brothers Grimm's story was developed from the French literary fairy tale of Persinette by Charlotte-Rose de Caumont de La Force (1698).

The tale is classified as Aarne–Thompson type 310 ("The Maiden in The Tower"). Its plot has been used and parodied in various media. Its best known line is, "Rapunzel, Rapunzel, let down your hair".

Plot

A lonely couple, who long for a child, live next to a large, extensive, high-walled subsistence garden, belonging to a sorceress.  The wife, experiencing pregnancy cravings, longs for the rapunzel that she sees growing in the garden (rapunzel is either the salad green and root vegetable Campanula rapunculus, or the salad green Valerianella locusta). She refuses to eat anything else and begins to waste away. Her husband fears for her life and one night he breaks into the garden to get some for her. When he returns, she makes a salad out of it and eats it, but she longs for more so her husband returns to the garden to retrieve some more. As he scales the wall to return home, the sorceress catches him and accuses him of theft. He begs for mercy and she agrees to be lenient, allowing him to take all the rapunzel he wants on condition that the baby be given to her when it's born. Desperate, he agrees.

When the wife has a baby girl, the sorceress takes her to raise as her own and names her "Rapunzel" after the plant her mother craved (in one version, her parents move away before she's born in an attempt to avoid surrendering her, only for the sorceress to turn up at their door upon her birth, unhampered by their attempt at relocation). She grows up to be a beautiful child with long golden hair. When she turns twelve, the sorceress locks her up in a tower in the middle of the woods, with neither stairs nor a door, and only one room and one window. In order to visit her, the sorceress stands at the bottom of the tower and calls out:
Rapunzel!
Rapunzel!
Let down your hair
That I may climb thy golden stair!

Jacob Grimm ostensibly believed that the strong alliteration of the rhyme indicated that it was a survival of the ancient form of Germanic poetry known as Stabreim, but in actuality, it was his liberal adaption of Schulz's direct German translation of Charlotte-Rose de Caumont de La Force's older French version Persinette, Persinette, descendez vos cheveux que je monte. 

One day, a prince rides through the forest and hears Rapunzel singing from the tower. Entranced by her ethereal voice, he searches for her and discovers the tower, but is unable to enter it. He returns often, listening to her beautiful singing, and one day sees the sorceress visit her as usual and learns how to gain access. When the sorceress leaves, he bids Rapunzel to let her hair down. When she does so, he climbs up and they fall in love. He eventually asks her to marry him, and she agrees.

Together they plan a means of escape, wherein he will come each night (thus avoiding the sorceress who visits her by day) and bring Rapunzel a piece of silk that she will gradually weave into a ladder. Before the plan can come to fruition, however, she has sexual intercourse with him. In the first edition (1812) of Kinder- und Hausmärchen (Children's and Household Tales, most commonly known in English as Grimms' Fairy Tales), she innocently says that her dress is growing tight around her waist, hinting at pregnancy. In later editions, she asks "Dame Gothel", in a moment of forgetfulness, why it is easier for her to draw up the prince than her. In anger, the sorceress cuts off her hair and casts her out into the wilderness to fend for herself.

When the prince calls that night, the sorceress lets the severed hair down to haul him up. To his horror, he finds himself meeting her instead of Rapunzel, who is nowhere to be found. After she tells him in a rage that he will never see Rapunzel again, he leaps or falls from the tower and lands in a thorn bush. Although it breaks his fall and saves his life, it scratches his eyes and blinds him.

For years, he wanders through the wastelands of the country and eventually comes to the wilderness where Rapunzel now lives with the twins whom she has given birth to, a boy and girl. One day, as she sings, he hears her voice again, and they are reunited. When they fall into each other's arms, her tears fall into his eyes and immediately restore his sight. He leads her and their twins to his kingdom where they live happily ever after.

Another version of the story ends with the revelation that the sorceress had untied Rapunzel's hair after the prince leapt from the tower, and it slipped from her hands and landed far below, leaving her trapped in the tower.

Origin and development

Mythological and religious inspiration 
Some researchers have proposed that the earliest possible inspiration for the “Maiden in the Tower” archetype is to the pre-Christian European (or proto-Indo-European) sun or dawn goddess myths, in which the light deity is trapped and is rescued. Similar myths include that of the Baltic solar goddess, Saulė, who is held captive in a tower by a king.  Inspiration may also be taken from the classical myth of the hero, Perseus; Perseus' mother, the Princess Danaë, was confined to a bronze tower by her own father, Acrisius, the King of Argos, in an attempt to prevent her from becoming pregnant, as it was foretold by the Oracle of Delphi that she would bear a son who would kill his grandfather.

Inspiration may come from Ethniu, daughter of Balor, in Irish myth.

Inspiration may come from the story of Saint Barbara of Nicomedia, who is said to have been a beautiful woman who was confined to a tower by her father to hide her away from suitors. While in the tower, she is said to have converted to Christianity and be ultimately martyred for her faith after a series of miracles delaying her execution. Her story was included in The Book of the City of Ladies, completed by 1405 by Christine de Pizan in vernacular French, which may have been highly influential on later writers, as it was popular throughout Europe.

Literary development 
The earliest surviving reference to a female character with long hair that she offers to a male lover to climb like a ladder appears in the epic poem Shahnameh by Ferdowsi. The heroine of the story, Rudāba, offers her hair so that her love interest Zāl may enter the harem where she lives. Zāl states instead that she should lower a rope so that she will not hurt herself.

The first written record of a story that may be recognized as Rapunzel is Giambattista Basile's Petrosinella, translating to parsley, which was published in Naples in the local dialect in 1634 in a collection entitled Lo cunto de li cunti (The Story of Stories). This version of the story differs from later versions as it is the wife not the husband who steals the plant, the maiden is taken by the villain as a child rather than a baby, and the maiden and the prince are not separated for years to be reunited in the end. Most importantly, this version of the story contains a “flight” scene in which Petrosinella uses magic acorns that turn into animals to distract the ogress while she pursues the couple fleeing the tower. This “flight” scene, with three magic objects used as distraction, is found in oral variants in the Mediterranean region, notably Sicily (Angiola), Malta (Little Parsley and Little Fennel), and Greece (Anthousa the Fair with Golden Hair).

In 1697, Charlotte-Rose de Caumont de La Force published a variation of the story, Persinette, while confined to an abbey due to perceived misconduct during service in the court of Louis XIV. Before her imprisonment, de la Force was a prominent figure in the Parisian salons and considered one of the early conteuses as a contemporary to Charles Perrault. This version of the story includes almost all elements that were found in later versions by the Grimm Brothers. It is the first version to include the maiden's out of wedlock pregnancy, the villain's trickery leading to the prince's blinding, the birth of twins, and the tears of the maiden restoring the prince's sight. The tale ends with the antagonist taking pity on the couple and transporting them to the prince's kingdom. While de la Force's claim that Persinette was an original story cannot be substantiated, her version was the most complex at the time and did introduce original elements.

German adaptation 
The very first known German translation of Charlotte-Rose de Caumont de La Force's tale Persinette came about in 1766 by Friedrich Immanuel Bierling under the name "Das Cabinet der Feen. Oder gesammelte Feen-Märchen in neun Theilen, Aus dem Französischen übersetzt", published in Nürenberg. More famously, Persinette was translated into German by Friedrich Schulz and appeared in 1790 in Kleine Romane (Little Novels), as it was Schulz who changed the plant and the maiden's name to Rapunzel. Jacob and Wilhelm Grimm included the story in their first (1812) and seventh (1857) edition publications of Children's and Household Tales and removed elements that they believed were added to the “original” German fairy tale. Although the Grimms' recounting of the fairy tale is the most prevalent version of the “Maiden in the Tower” in the western literary canon, the story does not appear to have connections to a Germanic oral folktale tradition. Notably, the 1812 publication retains the out of wedlock pregnancy that reveals the prince's visits to the witch, whereas in the 1857 version edited by Wilhelm Grimm, it is Rapunzel's slip of the tongue to address criticism that the tale was not appropriate for children. It can be argued that the 1857 version of the story was the first written for a primarily child-aged audience.

Distribution 
According to Greek folklorist Georgios A. Megas, fellow folklorist Michael Meracles concluded that the tale type originated in Southeastern Europe, by analysing 22 Greek variants, 2 Serbo-Croatian and 1 from Corsica.

Scholar Jack Zipes stated that the tale type is "extremely popular throughout Europe". However, scholar Ton Deker remarked that the tale type is "mainly known" in Central and South Europe, and in the Middle East. In the same vein, Stith Thompson argued for a Mediterranean origin for the story, due to "its great popularity" in Italy and nearby countries.

Scholar Ulrich Marzolph remarked that the tale type AT 310 was one of "the most frequently encountered tales in Arab oral tradition", albeit missing from The Arabian Nights compilation.

Themes and characterization 

Many scholars have interpreted “Maiden in the Tower” stories, which Rapunzel is a part of, as a metaphor for the protection of young women from pre-marital relationships by overzealous guardians. Scholars have drawn comparisons of the confinement of Rapunzel in her tower to that of a convent, where women's lives were highly controlled and they lived in exclusion from outsiders.

Scholars have also noted the strong theme of love conquering all in the story, as the lovers are united after years of searching in all versions after Persinette and are ultimately happily reunited as a family.

The seemingly unfair bargain that the husband makes with the sorceress in the opening of Rapunzel is a common convention in fairy tales, which is replicated in Jack and the Beanstalk when Jack trades a cow for beans or in Beauty and the Beast when Beauty comes to the Beast in return for a rose. Furthermore, folkloric beliefs often regarded it as dangerous to deny a pregnant woman any food she craved, making the bargain with the sorceress more understandable since the husband would have perceived his actions as saving his wife at the cost of his child. Family members would often go to great lengths to secure such cravings and such desires for lettuce and other vegetables may indicate a need for vitamins.

The “Maiden in the Tower” archetype has drawn comparisons to a possible lost matriarchal myth connected to the sacred marriage between the prince and the maiden and the rivalry between the maiden, representing life and spring, and the crone, representing death and winter.

Cultural legacy

Literary media

Andrew Lang included the story in his 1890 publication The Red Fairy Book. Other versions of the tale also appear in A Book of Witches (1965) by Ruth Manning-Sanders and in Paul O. Zelinsky's Caldecott Medal-winning picture book, Rapunzel (1997).

Anne Sexton wrote a poem called "Rapunzel" in her collection Transformations (1971), a book in which she re-envisions sixteen of the Grimm's Fairy tales.

Donna Jo Napoli wrote a critically acclaimed YA novel entitled Zel (1996), retelling the Rapunzel story from three perspectives: the maiden, her mother, and the prince.

Cress is the third book in the Lunar Chronicles, a young adult science fiction series written by Marissa Meyer that is an adaptation of Rapunzel. Crescent, nicknamed "Cress", is a prisoner on a satellite who is rescued and falls in love with her hero "Captain Thorne" amidst the story about "Cinder" a cyborg version of Cinderella. The Lunar Chronicles is a tetralogy with a futuristic take on classic fairy tales that also includes characters such as "Cinder" (Cinderella), "Scarlet" (Red Riding Hood) and "Winter" (Snow White).

Kate Forsyth has written two books about Rapunzel, one is a fictional retelling of the tale and of the life of Mademoiselle de la Force entitled, Bitter Greens, and her second book was nonfiction describing the development of the tale entitled, The Rebirth of Rapunzel: A Mythic Biography of the Maiden in the Tower. She described it as "a story that reverberates very strongly with any individual – male or female, child or adult – who has found themselves trapped by their circumstances, whether this is caused by the will of another or their own inability to change and grow".

In Nikita Gill's 2018 poetry collection Fierce Fairytales: & Other Stories to Stir Your Soul she has several poems that reference Rapunzel or Rapunzel's story including Rapunzel's Note Left for Mother Gothel and Rapunzel, Rapunzel.

In 2019, Simon Hood published a contemporary retelling of Rapunzel. Both the language and the illustrations modernised the story, while the plot itself remained close to traditional versions.

In 2022, Mary McMyne published a standalone adult historical fantasy novel The Book of Gothel, which speculates that the witch's character was inspired by the life of a medieval midwife named Haelewise, daughter-of-Hedda, who lived in 12th century Germania. The novel is a revisionist backstory for Rapunzel that also connects to elements of Snow White, Red Riding Hood, and other tales.

Film media
 The Story of Rapunzel (1951), a stop-motion animated short directed by Ray Harryhausen.
 A live action version was filmed for television as part of Shelley Duvall's series Faerie Tale Theatre, airing on Showtime. It aired on 5 February 1983. In it, the main character, Rapunzel is taken from her parents by an evil witch, and is brought up in an isolated tower that can only be accessed by climbing her unnaturally long hair. Jeff Bridges played the prince and Rapunzel's father, Shelley Duvall played Rapunzel and her mother, Gena Rowlands played the witch, and Roddy McDowall narrated.
 A 1988 German film adaption,  (meaning "Rapunzel or the Magic of Tears"), combines the story with the lesser-known Grimm fairy tale Maid Maleen. After escaping the tower, Rapunzel finds work as a kitchen maid in the prince's court, where she must contend with an evil princess who aims to marry him.
 A 1990 straight-to-video animated film adaption by Hanna-Barbera and Hallmark Cards, simply titled Rapunzel featured Olivia Newton-John narrating the story. The major difference between it and the Grimm fairy tale is that instead of making the prince blind, the evil witch transforms him into a bird, possibly a reference to The Blue Bird, a French variant of the story.
 Into the Woods is a musical combining elements from several classic fairy tales, in which Rapunzel is one of the main characters; it was also filmed for television in 1991 by American Playhouse. The story depicts Rapunzel as the adoptive daughter of the Witch that the Baker (Rapunzel's older brother, unbeknownst to him. Also the husband of the lonely childless couple.) is getting some items from who is later rescued by a prince. In the second half of the play, Rapunzel is killed by the Giant's Wife. The Witch then grieves for her and sings, "Witch’s Lament."
 A film adaptation of Into the Woods by The Walt Disney Company was released late in 2014 where Rapunzel is portrayed by Mackenzie Mauzy. The difference from the play is that Rapunzel is not killed by the Giant's Wife (Frances de la Tour). Instead, she rides off into the woods with her Prince (Billy Magnussen) in order to distance herself from the Witch who raised her.
 In Barbie as Rapunzel (2002), Rapunzel was raised by the evil witch Gothel (voiced by Anjelica Huston) and she acted as a servant for her. She uses a magic paintbrush to get out of captivity, but Gothel locks her away in a tower.
 In Shrek the Third (2007), Rapunzel (voiced by Maya Rudolph) was friends with Princess Fiona. She is shown to be the true love of the evil Prince Charming and helps to fool Princess Fiona and her group when they try to escape from Prince Charming's wrath.
 Walt Disney Animation Studios' Tangled (2010), which is a loose retelling and a computer-animated musical feature film. Princess Rapunzel (voiced by Mandy Moore) is more assertive in character, and was born a princess. Her long blonde hair has magical healing and restoration powers. A woman named Mother Gothel (voiced by Donna Murphy) kidnaps Rapunzel for her magical hair which would help maintain her youth. Rather than a prince, Rapunzel encounters an elusive thief named Flynn Rider/Eugene Fitzherbert (voiced by Zachary Levi). Rapunzel also features in Disney's Tangled short sequel, Tangled Ever After. There is also a series based on the events after the movie and before the short named Tangled The Series/ Rapunzel's Tangled Adventure and a movie which leads to the series called Tangled: Before Ever After.
 Walt Disney Pictures hired Ashleigh Powell to write the script for a live action Rapunzel movie. It is unknown if the film will be a remake of Tangled, a whole new adaptation, or a combination of both.

Television media

Live action television media 
Shirley Temple's Storybook (1958-1961) featured an media of Rapunzel in an episode which aired on 27 October 1958. Carol Lynley played Rapunzel and Agnes Moorehead played the evil witch.

Sesame Street (1969–present) has a "News Flash" skit with Kermit the Frog where he interviews the Prince trying to charm Rapunzel with the famous line. However, she is having a hard time hearing him and when she finally does understand him, she lets all her hair fall down (completely off her head), leaving the Prince confused as to what to do now.

In the American fairy tale miniseries, The Tenth Kingdom (2000), the main character, Virginia Lewis is cursed by a Gypsy witch. As a result, she grows hair reminiscent of Rapunzel's and is locked away by the Huntsman in a tower. Her only means of escape is by letting her hair down through the window of the tower so that the Wolf can climb up and rescue her. Not before he asks the iconic phrase, in his own way, "Love of my life, let down your lustrous locks!". The character, Rapunzel is also mentioned as being one of the great women who changed history, and she was Queen of the sixth Kingdom before eventually succumbing to old age.

Rapunzel appears in the Once Upon a Time episode The Tower (2014), portrayed by Alexandra Metz. In this show, Rapunzel is a young woman who becomes trapped in a large tower for many years after she searched for a plant called "night-root" that would remove her fear of becoming queen following her brother's death. Because of this, she has extremely long hair. It is revealed that consuming the substance created a doppelgänger fear spirit who represents all of the person's worst fears. After Prince Charming begins to fear that he will not make a good father to his and Snow White's baby, Robin Hood tells him where to find the night-root. He then climbs the tower and eventually helps Rapunzel face her fears by facing what truly scares her, which is herself. Presented with her own doppelganger, she is encouraged by Prince Charming and cuts off her hair, killing the figure and allowing her freedom. She explains to Prince Charming that her brother died trying to save her, and she doubts that her parents will forgive her. Again encouraged by Prince Charming, she returns her to their palace where she reunites with her accepting parents.

A second iteration of Rapunzel appears as one of the main antagonists in the seventh season of Once Upon a Time (Season 7, 2018), portrayed by Gabrielle Anwar and Meegan Warner in flashbacks. In this season, Rapunzel is Lady Tremaine, the wicked stepmother to Cinderella. In the past, Rapunzel had two daughters, Anastasia and Drizella, and made a deal with Mother Gothel to be locked in a tower in exchange for the safety of her family. Six years later, Rapunzel frees herself and when she returns to her family, she discovers she has gained a stepdaughter named Ella. At some point, Anastasia dies and Rapunzel blames her husband for the incident while Ella blames herself. Gothel plans to put Anastasia in the tower, but Rapunzel managed to turn the tables and lock Gothel in instead. Rapunzel plots to revive Anastasia by using the heart of Drizella, whom she favors least of the two daughters. Drizella discovers this and decides to get revenge on her mother by casting the "Dark Curse". She allies with Mother Gothel and sends the New Enchanted Forest residents to Hyperion Heights in Seattle. Rapunzel awakens from the curse, but lives as Victoria Belfrey and is given new memories making her believe she cast the curse to save Anastasia, while Drizella lives as Ivy Belfrey, her assistant and daughter. Cinderella and her daughter are also brought over by the curse. Rapunzel/Victoria manages to lock Gothel away in Belfrey Towers.

Animated television media 
Animated series presented by Pat Morita Britannica's Tales Around the World (1990–91), features three variations of the story.

The American television animated anthology series, Happily Ever After: Fairy Tales for Every Child (1995-2000), the classic story is retold with a full African-American cast and set in New Orleans. The episode starred Tisha Campbell-Martin as Rapunzel, Whoopi Goldberg as Zenobia the Hoodoo Diva, Meshach Taylor as the Woodcutter, Hazelle Goodman as the Woodcutter's Wife, Donald Fullilove as Friend #1, and Tico Wells as Friend #2.

Episode Rapunzel from Wolves, Witches and Giants (1995–99), season 1 episode 8.

German animated series Simsala Grimm (1999-2010), season 1 episode 8.

The music video of Mary (2004) by the Scissor Sisters features a spoof of the fairy tale animated by Don Bluth.

In the Mattel cartoon Ever After High (2013–2017), features Rapunzel's has two daughters: Holly O'Hair and Poppy O'Hair.

Tangled: The Series (2017–2020) is a 2D animated TV show based on Disney Animation's computer animated musical feature film Tangled. Mandy Moore and Zachary Levi reprise their roles of Rapunzel and Eugene Fitzherbert. A new main character named Cassandra appears, who is Rapunzel's feisty lady-in-waiting, and later revealed to be Mother Gothel's biological daughter. The series has a feature-length movie titled Tangled: Before Ever After released in 2017.

In one episode of Happy Tree Friends (1999–2016) entitled Dunce Upon a Time, Petunia has very long hair that Giggles uses to slide down on as a brief Rapunzel reference.

The Japanese anime series Grimm's Fairy Tale Classics (1987–1989) features the tale in its second season. It gives more spotlight to Rapunzel's parents, who are the local blacksmith and his wife, and it makes the witch more openly villainous.

See also

 Ethniu, daughter of Balor
 Rapunzel syndrome
 Danaë, daughter of King Acrisius and Queen Eurydice, who was trapped in a bronze tower or cave.
 Puddocky
 Maid Maleen

Notes

References

External links

 
 D.L. Ashliman's Grimm Brothers website. The classification is based on Antti Aarne and Stith Thompson, The Types of the Folktale: A Classification and Bibliography, (Helsinki, 1961).
 Translated comparison of 1812 and 1857 versions
 The Original 1812 Grimm A web site for the Original 1812 Kinder und Hausmärchen featuring references and other useful information related to the 1812 book in English.

 
Grimms' Fairy Tales
European fairy tales
German fairy tales
Witchcraft in fairy tales
Female characters in fairy tales
ATU 300-399